Tímea Papp (born in Kaposvár) is a Hungarian dancer and choreographer who can be recognized for her work in the Hungarian Film and Television Industry. Apart from graduating from both the Rotterdam Dance Academy and the Hungarian Dance Academy she participated in dance courses all around the world. Thanks to her knowledge and experience in many genres of dance from ballet through broadway and jazz all the way to contemporary dance she contributed to the success of award-winning feature films, theatrical productions like Chicago (musical), television shows such as Britain's Got Talent, America's Got Talent, Eurovision (Moscow, 2009 and Düsseldorf, 2011)  and Fake Off in addition to advertisements and other creative projects worldwide. Since 2004 she has been working on developing a special technique where she combines dancing with videomapping projections to create an interactive choreography supplemented by visual elements. From 2009 using videomapping technique has been a kind of "trademark" in her work.  She is currently the artistic director and choreographer of the dance team called Freelusion.

Early life 
Tímea Papp was born in Kaposvár, Hungary. She was raised in a family with three children, she has an older and a younger brother. Both her brothers grew up to be entrepreneurs; her younger brother became the co-founder of Freelusion. Her dad was a drummer who gave up being a professional musician for his family. Nevertheless, he never gave up creating rhythm with any object he could find around himself. Tímea's mother was an amateur dancer and a huge dance enthusiast her whole life. Tímea was infected with rhythm, music, and dancing from a very early age thanks to her parents. This impact was so great that she moved to Pécs in her teenage years so she could start her professional dancing training in the High School of Arts.

Field of Scientific Research, Mission 
As mentioned earlier, Tímea Papp growing up has been surrounded by inspiration which drew her towards dancing. Learning Latin dances and ballet in her childhood, she was fascinated by street dances in the early 80's.  Beside the dancing she spent 4 years studying  kung fu.  Her body awareness in space became very important to her. Rudolf von Laban movement theoretic's space harmony theory has been a great influence on her work. All her research in movement, space and body awareness and her education and experience as a dancer lead to creating her own project: "Spacerider", which can be interpreted as her own avatar in her high-tech interactive choreographies.

Education and training 
 1988-1992 High School of Arts, Pecs
 1993-1996 Rotterdam Dance Academy Codarts Faculty of Dance Teacher majoring in Jazz and Modern dance
 1992-2003 Courses: Budapest, Rotterdam, Amsterdam, London, Pecs, Tokyo, New York
 1998-2001 Hungarian Dance Academy, Budapest Faculty of Choreographer

Work experience as a dance teacher 
 High School of Arts, Pecs Modern dance teacher
 Faculty of Sciences, University of Pecs Jazz-and Modern dance teacher
 Budapest Contemporary Dance School Jazz-and Modern dance teacher
 Talentum Contemporary Dance School, Budapest
 Hungarian Dance Academy, Budapest Teacher of Jazz-and Modern dance
 Elmhurst School for Dancing and Performing Arts, England Modern dance teacher
 University of Theatre and Film Arts,  Jazz dance teacher
 Budapest Contemporary Dance Academy- Jazz-and Modern dance teacher
 Hungarian Dance Academy, Budapest - Teacher of Jazz-and Modern dance, training methods, Arts of choreography, Leading teacher of street-urban dance major

Choreographer 
 Competition for Inspirational Choreographers Budapest: ’Na, most ki kivel van? (Now, who is with whom?)’ Pecs Ballet: ’Idegenek (Strangers)’
 Pecs Ballet: ’Párkeresés (Looking for a partner)’ Utolsó Csepp Festival (Last Drop Festival): ’Hattyúdal (Swan-song)’ Attila Jozsef Theatre: ’Villon és a többiek (Villon and the others)’
 Pecs Ballet: ’Függő viszonyok (Dependence)’ Trafo: ’Trio’ University of Drama, Film and Television: ’Chicago’ musical Utolsó Csepp Festival (Last Drop Festival): ’Hitchcock’
 Madach Theatre: ’Chicago’ musical
 Hungarian Dance Academy Solo creations for international ballet competitions
 RTL Klub, Aranycsirke Awards Gala
 ’Egy szoknya, egy nadrág’ Hungarian feature film
 Choreographer and director of events and commercials 
 Madach Theater: ’They are playing our song’ musical
 Madach Theatre: ’Te édes, de jó vagy, légy más! (I love you, you’re perfect, now change!)’ musical
 3 seasons of ’Dancing with the stars’ RTL television
 ’Mahagonny’ opera Thalia Theater
 ’A kind of America 2’ Hungarian feature film
 Eurovision Moscow (Zoltan Ádok: ’Dance with me’)
 Sziget Festival Flashmob 
 3 seasons of ’Hungary’s got talent’  RTL television
 Choreographer of X Factor RTL television
 Eurovision Düsseldorf (Kati Wolf: What about my dreams)
 Car Shows  (Fiat, VW) Shanghai, Beijing, Delhi
 Ramy Ayach Music video in Beirut
 Britain's Got Talent contestant FREELUSION (semi final)
 America's Got Talent contestant SENSETION (semi final)
 Fake Off TruTV America contestant FREELUSION USA (final)
 Norwegian Dancing with the stars Commercial Skal we Danse
 IPTL tennis tour cheerleaders  (Singapore-Manila-Delhi-Dubai)
 Swing Hungarian feature film
 American Girl Disney production

Dancer / performer 
 Madach Theatre: ’Chicago’ musical (Mona)
 RTL Klub, ’Első Generáció (First Generation)’ – TV series (Alina)
 Performances and video clips in Miami and Tokyo
 National Dance Theatre: ’1W’, solo 
 Budapest Operetta Theatre: ’Púder (face-powder)’ choreographer: Eva Duda
 Music videos 
 ’Dancing with the stars’ Hungary
 ’Kind of America 2’ 
 Eurovision Moscow (Zoltan Ádok: ’Dance with me’)
 Spacerider project
 Freelusion Dance Company
 Touring with Spacerider and Freelusion (Shanghai, Delhi, Istanbul)
 Britain’s Got Talent contestant FREELUSION (semi final)
 Fake Off TruTV America contestant FREELUSION USA (final)
 IPTL tennis tour cheerleaders  (Singapore-Manila-Delhi-Dubai)

Awards 
 1999: Fülöp Viktor Scholarship 
 2005: Award of Excellence in the field of Dance Pedagogy

References

External links

1973 births
Living people
Hungarian choreographers
Hungarian female dancers